Paraschema is a genus of moth in the family Gelechiidae. It contains the species Paraschema detectendum, which is found in Bolivia.

References

Gelechiidae